Mischomedia is a genus of flies in the family Stratiomyidae.

Species
Mischomedia queenslandica Woodley, 1995

References

Stratiomyidae
Brachycera genera
Diptera of Australasia